Karriere in Paris is a 1952 East German film. It is based on the novel Père Goriot by Honoré de Balzac.

External links
 

1952 films
East German films
1950s German-language films
Films directed by Georg C. Klaren
Films based on works by Honoré de Balzac
Films set in the 1830s
Films set in Paris
German black-and-white films
1950s German films